Ukrainian-Mediterranean Airlines (also known as UM Air), Ukrayinsʹko-seredzemnomorsʹki avialiniyi, was an airline based in Kyiv, Ukraine.

History 
The airline was established by Lebanese businessmen in 1998 and began operations in June 2000. It was founded as an open-end joint-stock company. In 2003 UM Air had over 500 employees and carried 210,000 passengers.

In 2007, the Ukrainian Air Administration refused to renew UM Air's license because of safety concerns. In September 2007 the European Commission banned Ukrainian-Mediterranean Airlines from operating in the airspace over the European Union, citing safety issues. This meant that it was banned for safety reasons from operating services of any kind within the European Union. In November 2009, the airline was allowed to resume operations with its McDonnell Douglas MD-83 aircraft by the European Commission.

In 2013, UM Air was one of two Ukrainian airlines that had sanctions imposed against them by the US government. UM Air was accused of supplying British Aerospace BAe 146 series aircraft to Iranian airline Mahan Air and of training Mahan Air pilots and maintenance technicians. Mahan Air was itself already under sanction by the US government. UM's owner and Chairman Rodrigue Merhej was also personally placed under sanction.

Destinations
UM Air served the following scheduled destinations as of December 2017:

Iran
Tehran - Tehran Imam Khomeini International Airport
Jordan
Amman - Queen Alia International Airport
Lebanon
Beirut - Beirut-Rafic Hariri International Airport
Ukraine
Kyiv - Kyiv International Airport (Zhuliany) base

Fleet

Current fleet

The UM Air fleet consisted of the following aircraft (as of September 2016):

Previously operated

 1 Airbus A320-200
 Antonov An-24RV
 British Aerospace Avro RJ85
 British Aerospace Avro RJ100
 British Aerospace BAe 146-300
 Boeing 737-300
 1 Boeing 737-500
 McDonnell Douglas DC-9-50
 McDonnell Douglas MD-82
 McDonnell Douglas MD-83
 Tupolev Tu-134A
 Tupolev Tu-154B2
 Yakovlev Yak-42D

Accidents and incidents
On 26 May 2003, a UM Yakovlev Yak-42D operating as Ukrainian-Mediterranean Airlines Flight 4230 crashed near Maçka, Trabzon (Turkey) while carrying 62 Spanish troops from Afghanistan to Zaragoza Air Base. All 75 on board died.

References

External links

Official website 

Defunct airlines of Ukraine
Airlines established in 1998
Defunct charter airlines
Ukrainian companies established in 1998
Entities related to Iran Sanctions